Burmanniales Mart. (Burmanniales Blume, Burmanniales Heintze) was an order of monocotyledons, subsequently discontinued.

Description 
Small perennial or annual mycorrhizal herbs that are achlorophyllous (lacking chlorophyll) and mycotrophic or less often autotrophic.

Systematics and taxonomy 
Carl Friedrich Philipp von Martius listed the ordo (that is, family) Burmanniaceae in 1835 and consequently has been cited as an authority, although he acknowledged earlier descriptions by Carl Ludwig Blume (1827) and John Lindley (1830).

In 1927 Heintze elevated the Burmanniaceae family to the rank of the Burmanniales order. Subsequent authors have followed this, including Lawrence 1951, Hutchinson 1973, Dahlgren 1980) and Thorne 1992.  Johri et al. treat the 17 families of order Liliiflorae as  distributed over 5 suborders, including Burmanniineae Engl.. The latter suborder was then considered to contain two families, Burmanniaceae and Corsiaceae. As circumscribed by Dahlgren (sensu Dahlgren) it was one of five orders belonging to the superorder Liliiflorae and was composed of three families, Burmanniaceae (the type family), Thismiaceae, and Corsiaceae. Later, Burmanniales was included by Takhtajan in the 2009 revision of his system with the same family structure, as an order of superorder Lilianae (as the Liliiflorae were renamed).

Phylogeny 
Historically the Burmanniales were considered the closest to the orchids, being epigynous with small seeds, although this was not supported when subjected to cladistic analysis, suggesting these characteristics were actually convergent. Phylogenetic analysis showed that Burmanniales was actually polyphyletic, resulting in a redistribution of the families between the Liliales and Dioscoreales orders. With the type family Burmanniaceae placed in Dioscoreales (together with Thismiaceae), the Burmanniales order became redundant and was discontinued.

Etymology 
The name is derived by typification from the type genus Burmannia, named after the Dutch botanist Johannes Burman (1707–1779), followed by the suffix -iales, to indicate the rank of order.

Notes

References

Bibliography

Books 
 
 
 
 
 
 
 
 
 
 
 
 
  Excerpts

Chapters 
, in 
, in

Articles

Websites 
 
 
 
 
 

Historically recognized angiosperm orders